Rusumo was a district (akarere) in the former Rwandan province of Kibungo. The district was abolished, along with the Kibungo Province, during local government reorganisation in 2006. The area covered by the Rusumo district is now contained in the larger Kirehe District, within the Eastern Province. Population: 149,643 (2002 figures); area: 601 square kilometers.  It is separated from Tanzania by the Kagera River, which is distinguished by the Rusumo Falls.

Town 

There is also a town of the same name.

Statistics 

 Population = 17,393

See also 

 Railway stations in Rwanda - proposed

References 

 

Districts and municipalities of Kibungo
Kagera River